Red and Blue is the debut and only album from German singer Cee Farrow, released in 1983.

Background
Originally a model, Farrow signed to Rocshire Records to release a full studio album. He worked with producer Andy Lunn and co-wrote various tracks, mainly with German keyboardist Lothar Krell. Red and Blue was recorded at Hotline Studios between March–December 1982 and was released in 1983 in America. The album was not a commercial success, although the lead single "Should I Love You" peaked at No. 82 on the Billboard Hot 100 and No. 91 on the Billboard R&B Chart.

A second single, "Don't Ask Why", was also released, while "Wildlife Romance" was issued as a 12" promotional single.

The album remains out-of-print to date, having never been issued on CD or made available digitally. After the album's release, Rocshire Records suffered legal problems, which culminated in the seizing of the label's assets in January 1984. The label was shut down by U.S. Federal Marshalls as it had been financed entirely by millions of dollars that owner Rocky Davis' wife Shirley Davis had embezzled from Hughes Aircraft while she was working as an accountant there. As such, the label's master tapes remain in possession of the Feds.

After the album's release, Farrow reportedly opened a nightclub "The Bitter End" in 1985 within Hollywood. He eventually re-surfaced with another single "Imagination" in 1991. Farrow died in May 1993 in California of a brain disease attributed to AIDS.

Critical reception

Upon release, Billboard included the album as one of their "Recommended LPs" in June 1983. They wrote: "Farrow doesn't pose any chart threat, but his tough urban blues reflect much of the new music heard on the street though lacking the cute slickness of commercial contenders. Synthesizer and saxophone join forces to drive Farrow's hypnotic excursions, combining the drone and the danceable on "Don't Ask Why," "Heartbreaking Affair" and "Touched.""

Cash Box listed the album as one of their "feature picks" during August 1986. They commented: "Although the lyrical content of his debut album is rather lacking in substance, Farrow more than makes up for the prose through his outstanding vocal ability. Influenced by such British art-rockers as David Bowie and Roxy Music's Bryan Ferry, Farrow's warbling adds subtle contours and shading to such offerings as "Touched," the cynical "Backwards" and the quirky "Distant Picture," all of which will comfortably fit on modern music playlists. A ballad entitled "Think of Me" also bodes well for Farrow, as does the catchy "Heartbreaking Affair," which features delicate saxwork."

Track listing

Chart performance

Singles
"Should I Love You"

Personnel 
 Cee Farrow - vocals, artwork (cover concept)
 Pave - guitar
 Chris Hafner - guitar (tracks 2, 9)
 Lothar Krell - synthesizer, programming
 Peter Ponzol - saxophone, Lyricon 
 Marc Tobias - saxophone (track 1-2)
 Ken Taylor - bass
 Nick Name - drums
 Andy Lunn - producer, mixing, engineer
 Wolfgang Auer - executive producer
 Jon Caffrey - engineer
 Mathias Dietrich - assistant engineer
 Carmine Di - engineer, mixing (track 10)
 Filiale - other (clothes)
 Boris Guderjahn - photography

References

1983 debut albums
Cee Farrow albums